The Oregon Classic was a golf tournament on the Nationwide Tour from 1998 to 2008. It was played at the Shadow Hills Country Club in Junction City, Oregon, United States.

The 2008 purse was $500,000, with $99,000 going to the winner.

Winners

Bolded golfers graduated to the PGA Tour via the final Nationwide Tour money list.

Notes

References

External links
Official website
PGATOUR.com tournament site

Former Korn Ferry Tour events
Golf in Oregon
Sports competitions in Oregon
Annual events in Oregon
Junction City, Oregon
Recurring sporting events established in 1998
Recurring sporting events disestablished in 2008
1998 establishments in Oregon
2008 disestablishments in Oregon